Tea Leaves may refer to:

tea leaves

Film and TV
Tea Leaves (Mad Men)

Music

Albums
Tea Leaves, album by Karl Mueller (rock musician) 1996

Songs
"Tea Leaves (song)" by Ella Fitzgerald Composed by Frank Capano, Freedman, Berk covered by Keely Smith
"Tea Leaves" by Roommate (band) Composed by Kent Lambert
"Tea Leaves" by Groove Thing Composed by Bill Ware
"Tea Leaves" by Freddy Gardner
"Tea Tree Leaves Retreat" by Dustin Wong Dreams Say, View, Create, Shadow Leads 2012